Chilango is a monthly entertainment Mexican magazine. It was established by Grupo Expansión in November 2003 in Mexico City. It has won the National Journalism Prize of Mexico twice.

About the term Chilango

In the early 21st century, Chilango became by an accepted demonym for people from Mexico City. The self-acceptance of the term lead to the publication of the magazine as a way to subvert prejudices of people from the inner states of Mexico had about chilangos, originally created and intended by them as an offensive name.

The magazine
Sections of the magazine include:

DFnitivo
Word play with the Spanish pronunciation of DF, the Mexican Federal District or Distrito Federal.
A how-to style section intended as a parody of weird things that happen in the city, such as the unfinished (called surreal) Distribuidor Vial freeway over Río Becerra or the bottles filled with water to keep away dogs and other animals from invading gardens. Most of it is real but the logic of the situation is the questioned by the article.

Chilangoñol
A RAE parody in which the Mexican Spanish (focused in Mexico City slang) is explained, such as the words "onda", "equis" (fresa slang), "chingar" (considered offensive by some).

Aka el DF
Social and news sections parody ("aka" comes from "acá", but it's spelled with "k" by some). However, it's all factual.

El pinche gringo
Translated as The fucking gringo, and disappeared by 2007, it was an unusual article completely in English supposedly written by an American criticising Mexico City and its way of life.

DFondo
The collection of cover full-length articles.

Motto
During its first years, the magazine's slogan was a spoof of the racist "haz patria y mata un chilango" (perform patriotism and kill a chilango), marked as "haz patria y ama a un chilango" (perform patriotism and love a chilango). Later issues included new phrases such as "la ciudad que vale la pena vivir" (the worthy city to live) or "haz patria y levantamiento de tarro olímpico" (perform patriotism and olympic beer mug lifting).

References

External links
Chilango official website

2003 establishments in Mexico
Entertainment magazines
Magazines established in 2003
Mass media in Mexico City
Magazines published in Mexico
Monthly magazines published in Mexico
Spanish-language magazines